Under the Lantern (German: Unter der Laterne) is a 1928 German silent film directed by Gerhard Lamprecht and starring Lissy Arna, Gerhard Dammann and Mathias Wieman. The film's art direction was by Otto Moldenhauer.

Preservation status
On 31 May 2014, the San Francisco Silent Film Festival presented a newly restored 35mm print from the Deutsche Kinemathek.

Cast

References

Bibliography
 Caneppele, Paolo & Krenn, Günter. Elektrische Schatten. Filmarchiv Austria, 1999.

External links

1928 films
Films of the Weimar Republic
German silent feature films
Films directed by Gerhard Lamprecht
National Film films
German black-and-white films